Klas or KLAS may refer to:

 Klas (restaurant), a Czech restaurant in Cicero, Illinois, which operated from 1922 to 2016
 KLAS-TV, a television station (channel 8 analog/7 digital) licensed to Las Vegas, Nevada, United States
 The ICAO airport code for Harry Reid International Airport, in Las Vegas, Nevada, United States
 Kumon Leysin Academy of Switzerland, a private high school in Leysin, Switzerland
 Claes, a given name in Scandinavia
 Eri Klas (1939–2016), Estonian conductor